Fiorella D'Croz Brusatin (born 19 April 1979 in Cali) is an athlete from Colombia, who competes in triathlon and cross-country skiing. Brusatin competed at the second Olympic triathlon at the 2004 Summer Olympics. She took forty-second place with a total time of 2:21:03.46.

References

 Fiorella D'Croz at Triathlon.org

External links
 

1979 births
Living people
Sportspeople from Cali
Colombian female triathletes
Colombian female cross-country skiers
Olympic triathletes of Colombia
Triathletes at the 2004 Summer Olympics
Pan American Games competitors for Colombia
Triathletes at the 2003 Pan American Games
Triathletes at the 2007 Pan American Games